Pheasant Creek is a rural locality in the Shire of Banana, Queensland, Australia. In the  Pheasant Creek had a population of 48 people.

History 
Pheasant Creek Provisional School opened circa 1919 but closed circa 1921. In 1925 it reopened as Pheasant Creek State School and then closed circa 1928. It reopened on 29 Oct 1940 and closed finally in 1967.

In the  Pheasant Creek had a population of 48 people.

Road infrastructure
The Leichhardt Highway runs along part of the eastern boundary.

References 

Shire of Banana
Localities in Queensland